Charat (also Romanized as Chārāt; also known as Chārāt-e ‘Olyā) is a village in Moshrageh Rural District, Moshrageh District, Ramshir County, Khuzestan Province, Iran. At the 2006 census, its population was 171, in 33 families.

References 

Populated places in Ramshir County